Norfolk and Western Class J is a class of 4-4-2 steam locomotives purchased by Norfolk and Western Railroad, this being the second "J" class, and should not be confused with the later, more well known J class of 1941.  The retirement of the first J classes in 1900 left the designation available for reuse for these engines.  There were 7 of these Class Js made, and they were retired between 1931 and 1935, once again leaving the "J" class designation available to be reused in 1941.

References

Steam locomotives of the United States
J2
Scrapped locomotives
Standard gauge locomotives of the United States
Baldwin locomotives
Railway locomotives introduced in 1903